The 1918 American Cup was the annual open cup held by the American Football Association. Twenty nine teams began the tournament which culminated in Bethlehem's third straight championship.

American Cup Bracket

Final

See also
 1918 National Challenge Cup

References

Amer
American Cup